Ibn Abi al-Ashʿath (died 975 CE) was a Persian physician of medieval Islam. He wrote many commentaries on Galen's works.

He died in Mosul, Iraq.

Physiology 
Ahmad ibn Abi al-Ash'ath described the physiology of the stomach in a live lion in his book al-Quadi wa al-muqtadi. He wrote:When food enters the stomach, especially when it is plentiful, the stomach dilates and its layers get stretched...onlookers thought the stomach was rather small, so I proceeded to pour jug after jug in its throat…the inner layer of the distended stomach became as smooth as the external peritoneal layer. I then cut open the stomach and let the water out. The stomach shrank and I could see the pylorus…Ahmad ibn Abi al-Ash'ath observed the physiology of the stomach in a live lion in 959. This description preceded William Beaumont by almost 900 years, making Ahmad ibn al-Ash'ath the first person to initiate experimental events in gastric physiology.

Works
His works include:
الأدوية المفردة
الحيوان
العلم الالهي
الجدري و الحصبة و الحميقاء
الرسام و البرسام و مداواتهما
القولونج و أسبابه و مداواته
البرص و البهق
الصريح
الاستسقاء
ظهور الدم
 الماليخوليا
 تركيب الأدوية
 أمراض المعدة و مداواتها

References

10th-century Iranian physicians
975 deaths
Year of birth unknown
Date of birth unknown